Praveen Kumar Gorakavi (born 24 May 1989) is an Indian scientist, chemical engineer, inventor and consultant, recognised as a polymath and former child prodigy for his works in science and engineering from childhood.

Praveen Kumar Gorakavi has co-founded The Phi Factory, a socially conscious R&I initiative that develops one social innovation for every three commercial technologies it develops.

Early life and education 

Gorakavi studied chemical engineering at the Osmania University and later dropped out of the Ph.D. programme from the Indian Institute of Chemical Technology to pursue innovation at The Phi Factory.

Career 

Gorakavi's innovations span multiple scientific fields. He has developed a low-cost artificial limb, products for water purification, food storage, and biofuel synthesis.

Notable Works

At 13 years of age, Praveen devised a calendar for 20,000 years (from 10,000 BC to 10,000 AD). He identified some 27 mathematical equations on which an ideal calendar should be based. Later, he extended this calendar to 40,000 years and even rendered it into the Braille script. He designed a low-cost artificial leg with knee and ankle movement. He has also designed a low-cost mechanical brailler to increase braille literacy in the developing world.

In another instance, he developed a pen that could produce as many as 256 colours. This same concept could be used for nail paint, face foundation and other cosmetics. He also worked on fragrance encapsulation technology for sanitary pads, baby diapers and detergent powder. He also developed a holographic ink that makes segregation of packaging materials easy and enhances the productivity more than 2.5 times. The other product from Gorakavi's stable includes wrinkle free composite suit fabric that finds a use apparels segment. Then there is 'dosa' premix formulation in a can. The other technologies include a water purification device, orthopaedic catheter for spinal restoration and liquid jetting mechanism for electric tooth brush among others.

Praveen Kumar Gorakavi, who started off as a child prodigy and went on to commercialise 28 technologies in partnership with various companies including Fortune 500 companies, government agencies and scientific institutions.

Recognition

Gorakavi was named Outstanding Engineer/Scientist for 2009-10 by FAPCCI and is considered to be the youngest recipient of this award. Prior to this he had been awarded the Balshree by the Government of India and the state of Andhra Pradesh had conferred its Ugadi Gaurav Puraskar award. He has also been named the "Best technologist – for disabled people empowerment" by Andhra Pradesh.

Gorakavi was included in the Forbes Asia 30 Under 30 list for 2019, in healthcare and science category.

Gorakavi worked on hybrid solar energy encapsulation technology, involving solar spectrum bifurcation and subsequent concentration, as a part of doctoral studies at Indian Institute of Chemical Technology in Hyderabad, India.

The Phi Factory

Gorakavi co-founded The Phi Factory, a socially conscious R&I initiative that develops one social innovation for every three commercial technologies it develops. Gorakavi developed G-FP, a paper additive chemical technology with which paper-makers turn the paper lighter by 21 per cent and at a 9% reduced cost. The Phi Factory is also coming up with bio-plastic materials.

References

External links 
 Official Website of Praveen Gorakavi
 The Phi Factory - About Us
 TEDxVGEC Talk
 TEDxGNI Talk
 Youtube Video on Praveen
 Praveen Kumar Gorakavi - Blog
 IBN-FAPCCI
 TANA Global science Fair
 Times of India

20th-century Indian inventors
20th-century Indian engineers
Indian patent holders
Indian children
Scientists from Hyderabad, India
Living people
1989 births
21st-century Indian inventors

Osmania University alumni